Campeonato Nacional de Rugby is the main rugby union competition in Portugal. This championship is organized by the Portuguese Rugby Federation. The competition is organized into three Divisions:
 CN Honra/Super Bock (8 teams)
 Campeonato Nacional de Rugby I Divisão (8 teams)
 Campeonato Nacional de Rugby II Divisão (4 groups of 5/6 teams each)

External links 
Portuguese Rugby Federation Official Website